Cross-country skiing at the 1980 Winter Paralympics consisted of 28 events, 18 for men and 10 for women.

Medal table

Medal summary 
The competition events were:

5 km: men - women
10 km: men - women
20 km: men
4x5 km relay: men - women
4x10 km relay: men

Each event had separate standing, sitting, or visually impaired classifications:

1A - standing: single leg amputation above the knee
2A - standing: single leg amputation below the knee
2B - standing: double leg amputation below the knee, mild cerebral palsy, or equivalent impairment
3A - standing: single arm amputation
3B - standing: double arm amputation
5 - sitting
5A - visually impaired: under 10% functional vision
5B - visually impaired: no functional vision

Men's events

Women's events

See also
Cross-country skiing at the 1980 Winter Olympics

References 

 
The information from the International Paralympic Committee (IPC) website is based on sources which does not present all information from earlier Paralympic Games (1960-1984), such as relay and team members. (Per nov.16, 2010)
 
 Historical Medallists : Vancouver 2010 Winter Paralympics, Official website of the 2010 Winter Paralympics
 Winter Sport Classification, Canadian Paralympic Committee

External links
Picture of Norwegian skier Geir Vegard Ålien and Crown Prince Harald at Scanpix

1980 Winter Paralympics events
1980
Paralympics